The Midi Music Festival, sometimes also called Midi Modern Music Festival or simply Midi Festival is among China's largest rock music festivals and is hosted by the Beijing Midi School of Music.  Since its inauguration in 1997 it has been held each year in Beijing during the May Day holiday (May 1–3), with some breaks in 2003, 2004 and 2008 (all times held in October). Currently, it change to（ April 28th to May 1st).  The 2008 festival was delayed to October for reasons related to the 2008 Summer Olympics, and in 2020 and 2021 they were cancelled due to COVID.  The festival currently is held annually in four Chinese cities: Beijing, Shanghai, Suzhou and Shenzhen.

The 2006 festival, held in Beijing's Haidian Park, hosted 40-80 thousand visitors, and featured performances by more than 50 bands (including 18 foreign bands, such as Alev, Monokino, Yokohama Music Association, The Wombats, and The Mayflies) performing on four stages (Main Stage, Guitarchina Stage, Mini Midi Stage, and Disco Stage). The artists represented the genres of rock, electro, and DJ. The 2007 festival included UK acts the Crimea, Kava Kava (band), Dave Stewart of the Eurythmics, and Soundtrack Of Our Lives.

The festival regularly features environmental themes as their slogan, such as raising awareness for animals threatened with extinction and PM2.5 for their 2012 festivals.

Since 2008, Rock in China is providing the English language website for the Midi Modern Music Festival.

The Australian band The On Fires played at the 2011 festival.

The 2011 festival featured Japanese band GOOD4NOTHING. They were the first to perform 16 times.

The 2012 festival featured Australian band Arcane Saints.

See also
Beijing Jazz Festival
Beijing Pop Festival
Chinese rock
Modern Sky Festival

References

External links 

 Official Midi Homepage 
 Interview with Zhang Fan, headmaster of the Midi School about the Midi Festival
 Article on Midi Festival by Lin Xu on City Moments

Rock festivals in China
Music festivals established in 1997
1997 establishments in China
Electronic music festivals in China